Grabowo may refer to the following places:
Grabowo, Gniezno County in Greater Poland Voivodeship (west-central Poland)
Grabowo, Wągrowiec County in Greater Poland Voivodeship (west-central Poland)
Grabowo, Września County in Greater Poland Voivodeship (west-central Poland)
Grabowo, Kuyavian-Pomeranian Voivodeship (north-central Poland)
Grabowo, Maków County in Masovian Voivodeship (east-central Poland)
Grabowo, Gmina Olszewo-Borki in Masovian Voivodeship (east-central Poland)
Grabowo, Ostrów Mazowiecka County in Masovian Voivodeship (east-central Poland)
Grabowo, Przasnysz County in Masovian Voivodeship (east-central Poland)
Grabowo, Sierpc County in Masovian Voivodeship (east-central Poland)
Grabowo, Gmina Goworowo in Masovian Voivodeship (east-central Poland)
Grabowo, Augustów County in Podlaskie Voivodeship (north-east Poland)
Grabowo, Kolno County in Podlaskie Voivodeship (north-east Poland)
Grabowo, Łomża County in Podlaskie Voivodeship (north-east Poland)
Grabowo, Sokółka County in Podlaskie Voivodeship (north-east Poland)
Grabowo, Gdańsk County in Pomeranian Voivodeship (north Poland)
Grabowo, Kwidzyn County in Pomeranian Voivodeship (north Poland)
Grabowo, Gołdap County in Warmian-Masurian Voivodeship (north Poland)
Grabowo, Iława County in Warmian-Masurian Voivodeship (north Poland)
Grabowo, Mrągowo County in Warmian-Masurian Voivodeship (north Poland)
Grabowo, Nidzica County in Warmian-Masurian Voivodeship (north Poland)
Grabowo, Gryfino County in West Pomeranian Voivodeship (north-west Poland)
Grabowo, Kamień County in West Pomeranian Voivodeship (north-west Poland)
Grabowo, Kołobrzeg County in West Pomeranian Voivodeship (north-west Poland)
Grabowo, Łobez County in West Pomeranian Voivodeship (north-west Poland)
Grabowo, Sławno County in West Pomeranian Voivodeship (north-west Poland)
Grabowo, Stargard County in West Pomeranian Voivodeship (north-west Poland)
Grabowo, Szczecinek County in West Pomeranian Voivodeship (north-west Poland)
Grabowo, Szczecin

See also
 The same name may be transliterated differently from different native languages:
 Hrabove (disambiguation)
 Grabovo (disambiguation)
 Grabowo (disambiguation)